Alfredo Ernesto Cubías Borges (born 27 November 1945) is a Salvadoran middle-distance runner. He competed in the men's 800 metres at the 1968 Summer Olympics.

References

1945 births
Living people
Athletes (track and field) at the 1968 Summer Olympics
Salvadoran male middle-distance runners
Olympic athletes of El Salvador
Place of birth missing (living people)
20th-century Salvadoran people